Lazard is an investment bank.

Lazard may also refer to:

 Lazard (surname)
 Lazard, a character in the video game Crisis Core: Final Fantasy VII
 Lazard station, a former railway station in Montreal, replaced by Bois-Franc station in 1995

See also
 Lazar (disambiguation)
 Lazare (disambiguation)